Zeytinburnu SK is a Turkish football club established in 1953 and based in the Zeytinburnu district of Istanbul, Turkey.

They hold the record for worst performance in First League history during the 96/97 season, when they lost 27 matches out of 34, with 5 draws and only 2 wins. Their success percentage was 13.2%.

They played again in the First League between 1989–1991, 1993–1995 and 1996–1997.

Zeytinburnuspor  played in the Istanbul First Amateur League after getting relegated from the Istanbul Super Amateur League in the 2012–13 season. After two seasons in the First Amateur League they returned to the Super Amateur League.

League participations
 Turkish Super League: 1989–91, 1993–95, 1996–97
 TFF First League: 1987–89, 1991–93, 1995–96, 1997–00
 TFF Second League: 1984–87, 2000–02, 2006–10
 TFF Third League: 2002–06, 2010–11
 Turkish Regional Amateur League: 2011–12
 Amatör Futbol Ligleri: 2012–13, 2015–16
 Istanbul First Amateur League: 2013–15, 2016–18
 Istanbul Second Amateur League: 2018-

Women's Football Honours
Turkish Women's Football League
 Winners (1): 2001-02
 Runners-up (1): 2000-01

References

External links 
Zeytinburnuspor on TFF.org

 
Football clubs in Istanbul
Association football clubs established in 1953
1953 establishments in Turkey
Süper Lig clubs